Science & Theology News was a monthly international newspaper of the Templeton Foundation that focused on science and religion and dialogue between them, specifically the point of view that both are worthwhile and compatible endeavors.

Harold G. Koenig was the publisher and Karl Giberson the editor-in-chief.

The newspaper ceased publication in Fall of 2006 after more than 60 issues.

External links 
 Science & Theology News
 about Science & Theology News from the John Templeton Foundation
 Science News, Technology News, Physics, Nanotechnology, Space Science, Earth Science and Medicine

Newspapers established in 2000
Publications disestablished in 2006
John Templeton Foundation
Defunct newspapers published in Pennsylvania
Defunct monthly newspapers